Brigman-Chambers House is a historic house located at Weaverville, Buncombe County, North Carolina.

Description and history 
The earliest log section was built about 1845, and forms the rear ell. It was raised to a full two stories in the 1930s, and additions were made to the ell about 1960 and 2000. The main section was built about 1880, and is a two-story, frame I-house dwelling. It features a two-story portico. Both sections are sheathed in weatherboard.

It was listed on the National Register of Historic Places on June 2, 2004.

References

Houses on the National Register of Historic Places in North Carolina
Houses completed in 1880
Houses in Buncombe County, North Carolina
National Register of Historic Places in Buncombe County, North Carolina
I-houses in North Carolina